CCleaner (originally Crap Cleaner), developed by Piriform Software, is a utility used to clean potentially unwanted files and invalid Windows Registry entries from a computer. It is one of the longest-established system cleaners, first launched in 2004. It was originally developed for Microsoft Windows only, but in 2012, a macOS version was released. An Android version was released in 2014.

Features 
CCleaner can delete potentially unwanted files left by certain programs, including Microsoft Edge, Internet Explorer, Firefox, Google Chrome, Opera, Safari, Windows Media Player, eMule, Google Toolbar, Netscape, Microsoft Office, Nero, Adobe Acrobat, McAfee, Adobe Flash Player, Sun Java, WinRAR, WinAce, WinZip and GIMP along with browsing history, cookies, recycle bin, memory dumps, file fragments, log files, system caches, application data, autocomplete form history, and various other data. The program includes a registry cleaner to locate and correct problems in the Windows registry, such as missing references to shared DLLs, unused registration entries for file extensions, and missing references to application paths. CCleaner 2.27 and later can wipe the MFT free space of a drive, or the entire drive.

CCleaner can uninstall programs or modify the list of programs that execute on startup. Since version 2.19, CCleaner can delete Windows System Restore points. CCleaner can also automatically update installed programs and computer drivers.

CCleaner also has its own web browser called CCleaner Browser. CCleaner Browser is included to optionally install in the CCleaner installer, but it can also be installed from its website. CCleaner Browser avoids advertising, avoids tracking, has built-in security against all kinds of malware, phishing, malicious downloads, and also avoids unwanted elements such as pop-ups or excessive browser cache. It is based on Google's free and open-source project Chromium. The browser is only available for Microsoft Windows.

History 
CCleaner was first launched in 2004 for Microsoft Windows. It remained a Windows-only utility until 2012. On 2 June 2011, Piriform announced a public beta test program for CCleaner for Mac. The Mac version graduated to the test stage on 30 January 2012.

A commercial Network Edition was also introduced. Piriform released CCleaner for Android in 2014.

Critical reception 
CNET editors gave the application a rating of 5/5 stars, calling it a 'must-have tool'. It was awarded Editor's Choice Award in April 2009 by CNET. In 2016 Piriform announced 2 billion CCleaner downloads worldwide. In January 2014 it had been the most popular software on FileHippo for more than a year, and had a 5-star editor's rating on download.zone and Softpedia. CCleaner has been reviewed by Chip.de, TechRadar, PC Magazine and  TechRepublic.

Data collection 
Upon an error in the code, the Active Monitoring component of CCleaner 5.45, which was designed to measure junk levels to trigger cleaning, switched back on again. Piriform recognized this error and confirmed to users that the Active Monitoring feature did not report data. It then changed Active Monitoring to the more accurate title of 'Smart Cleaning'. After criticism later versions allowed data collection to be controlled separately by the user, although some data collection, such as OS and language, which is necessary for the app to be delivered, is still on by default as outlined in the company's Data Factsheet. Piriform states that the data collection is completely anonymous and is used to improve product quality.

Bundled software 
In December 2018, it was reported that users installing CCleaner would also have Avast Antivirus installed without their permission, with TechSpot claiming this arguably made CCleaner no better than the malware it was supposed to defend against. Piriform denied this.

In July 2020, Microsoft Windows Defender began flagging the free version of CCleaner as a "potentially unwanted application", stating that "while the bundled applications themselves are legitimate, bundling of software, especially products from other providers, can result in unexpected software activity that can negatively impact user experiences." Piriform rolled out an update days later and third-party software installation is now optional when installing the program.

Malware infection 
After Piriform was acquired by Avast, in September 2017, CCleaner 5.33 was compromised by the incorporation into the distributed program of the Floxif trojan horse that could install a backdoor, enabling remote access to 2.27 million machines which had installed CCleaner to be infected. Avast insisted that the malware was already in CCleaner version 5.33, prior to the purchase of Piriform. Forty of the infected machines received a second-stage payload that appears to have targeted technology companies Samsung, Sony, Asus, Intel, VMWare, O2, Singtel, Gauselmann, Dyn, Chunghwa and Fujitsu. On 13 September, Piriform released CCleaner 5.34 and CCleaner Cloud 1.07.3191, without the malicious code.

On 21 October 2019, Avast disclosed a second security breach during which attackers tried again to insert malware inside CCleaner releases. That attempt was unsuccessful.

References

External links 
 
 

Android (operating system) software
Utilities for macOS
Uninstallers for Windows
Data erasure software
Utilities for Windows
Freeware
Piriform Software
2003 software
Companies' terms of service
Gen Digital software